Carl Miele (25 July 1869, in Herzebrock – 24 December 1938, in Gütersloh) was a German businessman. He was a company co-founder of the German company Miele.

Life 
In 1899, he founded together with Reinhard Zinkann the company Miele. The company has always been a family-owned, family-run company. Carl Miele became an honorary citizen of the German city of Gütersloh. Miele was married and his son was Carl Miele, jun. (1897–1986). His grandson was Rudolf Miele (1929–2004), German entrepreneur.

Literature 
 
 Marion Steinhart: Carl Miele. Ullstein, Munich 2000,

External links 
 Miele.com

References 

German company founders
20th-century German businesspeople
German industrialists
People from Gütersloh
1869 births
1938 deaths